Geoff Bergman is a metal rock musician.

Bergman played bass guitar for both Curl Up and Die and Poison the Well.

References

Year of birth missing (living people)
Living people
American heavy metal bass guitarists
American rock bass guitarists
American male bass guitarists
Poison the Well members